Peshawar Subdivision formerly Frontier Region Peshawar is a subdivision in Khyber Pakhtunkhwa province of Pakistan. The region is named after Peshawar District which lies to the north and west and also borders Nowshera District to the east and Kohat Subdivision to the south. It is administered by the district coordination officer (DCO) of Peshawar District. The main settlement in Peshawar division is Kalakhel.
GDP nominal 7 billion US dollars

Geography and climate

Demography
The predominant first language is Pashto, spoken by 99.2% of the inhabitants of the district.

The main and only tribe of FR Peshawar is the sub-tribe Adam Khel of Afridis. The Afridi tribe is divided into 8 sub-tribes. Details has given below:-
 Adam Khel 
 Malk Din Khel
 Qamber Khel
 Aqa Khel
 Zakha Khel
 Koki Khel
 Qamer Khel and
 Sipah.

See also
Federally Administered Tribal Areas
Peshawar District

References

External links
Government of the Federally Administered Tribal Areas
Pakistani Federal Ministry of States and Frontier Regions

Durand Line
Frontier Regions
Frontier